Jashnn — The Music Within  is a 2009 Indian Hindi-language musical romance film written by Shagufta Rafiq, directed by Raksha Mistry & Hasnain S Hyderabadwala,  starring Adhyayan Suman, Anjana Sukhani, Shahana Goswami and Pakistani actor Humayun Saeed. It is produced by Vishesh Films.

Synopsis 

Jashnn the movie, is based on the character Akash Verma (Adhyayan Suman), a 23-year-old man, who thirsts to becoming a singing icon that can blaze a trail for himself among the galaxy of existing stars. But though he has dreams in his heart, he has been unable to find that distinctive voice that he can call his own, that will propel him to the top.

Only when he's shattered by life and unflinchingly looks at the sordid truth straight in the face — that he is freeloading off his elder sister Nisha (Shahana Goswami), who in order to offer Akash a decent life style, has become the mistress of a rich businessman, Aman Bajaj (Humayun Saeed). Even though she is just a mistress, she is able to touch Aman's inner core.

Call it irony or a twist of fate, but the person who sees Akash through this dark times and mentors him when he's down and out is none other than the sister of the very person who Akash hates most in the world – Aman Bajaj. It is Sara Bajaj (Anjana Sukhani), Aman's sister, who makes him realize that he is an extremely talented man who is simply going through a bad phase and that the biggest crime a human being can commit, is to give up on himself.

Spurred by life's bittersweet lessons, and Sara's genuine love and support, Akash, in the harshest winter of his life discovers an invincible summer within himself, thereby discovering his own voice. With this very special tune which has been soaked with the passion of his lived life, he not only touches his inexhaustible potential and becomes an overnight star but also brings dignity it his beleaguered sister, humbles his biggest detractor Aman Bajaj and in the process, lives up to the faith that Sara had in him all along.

Cast 
 Adhyayan Suman as Akash Verma
 Shahana Goswami as Nisha Verma
 Humayun Saeed as Aman Bajaj
 Anjana Sukhani as Sara Bajaj
 Rajendra Sethi
 Natasha Jain
 Atul Kinagi
 Keshav Nadkarni
 Ravi Sharma
 Sumeet Vyas

Music 

The music of Jashnn was composed by Shaarib-Toshi, Nouman Javaid and Sandesh Shandilya, with lyrics provided by Kumaar, Nouman Javaid and Neelesh Misra. Songs like "Nazarein Karam" & "Aaya Re were popular on release.

References

External links 
 

2009 films
2000s Hindi-language films
2000s musical films
Indian musical films